USS Watson (DD-482) was a United States Navy destroyer which was never laid down, her construction contract being cancelled in 1946.

Watson was planned as a modified Fletcher-class destroyer to be built by the Federal Shipbuilding and Drydock Company at Kearny, New Jersey. She was to be powered by an experimental diesel propulsion system. However, due to more pressing World War II destroyer construction programs, Watson was never laid down, and her construction contract was ultimately cancelled on 7 January 1946.

References

Chesneau, Roger. Conways All the Worlds Fighting Ships 1922–1946. New York: Mayflower Books, Inc., 1980. .

Ships built in Kearny, New Jersey
Cancelled ships of the United States Navy
Fletcher-class destroyers of the United States Navy